The Long Shop Museum is an industrial museum in the town of Leiston in the English county of Suffolk. The museum is dedicated to the history of Richard Garrett & Sons who manufactured agricultural machinery, steam engines and trolleybuses in Leiston.

The museum is housed in one of the remaining part of Leiston Works. It was built in 1852–3 as an engineering workshop for the manufacture of portable steam engines and consists of an open central area and fitters' galleries on the level of the first floor. The building is a Grade II* listed building.

References

External links

Long Shop Museum

Museums in Suffolk
Steam museums in England
Agriculture museums in the United Kingdom
Industry museums in England
Grade II* listed buildings in Suffolk
Industrial archaeological sites in England